Shmee may refer to:
 Shmee150 (Tim Burton, born 1987), also known as Shmee, a British car vlogger
 Shmee, a fictional companion of comic book character Squee

See also
Smee (disambiguation)
 Shmi Skywalker-Lars, a member of the fictional Skywalker family in Star Wars